Piccadilly Gardens is a tram stop in Zone 1 of Greater Manchester's Metrolink light rail system. It is located beside Piccadilly Gardens in Manchester city centre, and serves both as a transport hub (by integrating with the adjacent Manchester Piccadilly Gardens bus station), and interchange station (which can be used for changing between Metrolink lines).

Piccadilly Gardens tram stop opened on 27 April 1992, as part of Metrolink's Phase 1. The station was rebuilt during 2009 with a wider platform and a new canopy, reopening on 2 November 2009. The stop is one of the most used on the Metrolink network.

History
In 1931, a new bus station was opened on Parker Street on the former site of the Manchester Royal Infirmary, providing a central transport interchange for bus passengers. In 1945, adjacent site was landscaped as an ornamental sunken garden and named Piccadilly Gardens.

In 1991, construction work began on a new light rail transport network, Manchester Metrolink. New tram lines were laid along the southern and western sides of Piccadilly Gardens, and a new tram stop constructed alongside the bus station, providing an inter-modal exchange between tram and bus.

Services

Service pattern 
Services mostly run every 12 minutes on all routes.

At peak times (07:15 – 19:30 Monday to Friday, 09:30 – 18:30 Saturday):

5 trams per hour to Altrincham
5 trams per hour to Ashton-under-Lyne
5 trams per hour to Bury
5 trams per hour to Eccles
5 trams per hour to Etihad Campus
5 trams per hour to MediaCityUK
10 trams per hour to Piccadilly

Offpeak (all other times during operational hours):

5 trams per hour to Altrincham
5 trams per hour to Ashton-under-Lyne
5 trams per hour to Bury
5 trams per hour to Eccles (via MediaCityUK)
10 trams per hour to Piccadilly

Gallery

References

External links

Piccadilly Gardens Stop Information
Metrolink City Centre area map

Tram stops in Manchester
Tram stops on the Altrincham to Piccadilly line
Piccadilly Gardens